Robert Ben Lobban Wallace (born 15 May 1970) is a British politician and former soldier who has served as Secretary of State for Defence since 2019. A member of the Conservative Party, he has been the Member of Parliament (MP) for Wyre and Preston North, formerly Lancaster and Wyre, since 2005.

Before becoming an MP, he was a Conservative list Member of the Scottish Parliament (MSP) for North East Scotland from 1999 to 2003. He stood down in 2003 and moved to Lancashire as he sought selection for a Westminster constituency in England. Following election as an MP and after serving as a backbencher for nearly five years, he was appointed as Parliamentary Private Secretary to the Secretary of State for Justice, Ken Clarke, from 2010 to 2014. Wallace was then made a whip from July 2014 to May 2015. Following the 2015 general election and the formation of the majority Cameron government, he became Parliamentary Under-Secretary of State for the Northern Ireland Office. In 2016, he was appointed Minister of State for Security and Economic Crime by Theresa May, holding the position until she left office in July 2019. A supporter of Boris Johnson, Wallace was promoted to the senior cabinet role of Secretary of State for Defence, after Johnson became Prime Minister. He continued the role under Liz Truss and Rishi Sunak.

Before politics, he held the rank of captain in the Scots Guards, a regiment of the British Army.

Early life
Wallace was born on 15 May 1970 in Farnborough, Kent. His father was a soldier in the 1st King's Dragoon Guards and served in Malaya.

Wallace was educated at Millfield, a private school in Somerset. While at school, he attended a young officers’ course for the Royal Scots Dragoon Guards, and after leaving school was interviewed by the Regular Commissions Board, then spent some time as a ski instructor with the Austrian National Ski School in the village of Alpbach in Austria.

Military career
After training as a cadet at the Royal Military Academy Sandhurst, in June 1991 Wallace was commissioned into the Scots Guards as a second lieutenant, with a short service commission. From 1991 to 1998, he served in Germany, Cyprus, Belize, and Northern Ireland. In April 1993, he was promoted to lieutenant, and also in 1993 was mentioned in dispatches, for an incident in Northern Ireland in which the patrol he was commanding captured an entire IRA active service unit attempting to carry out a bomb attack against British troops. In 1996 he was promoted to captain.

Wallace was on duty on the night of the death of Diana, Princess of Wales, and was a member of the party sent to Paris to bring home her body.

In June 1998, Wallace transferred from the Active List to the Regular Army Reserve of Officers as a captain, thereby ending his active service and beginning a period of call-up liability. He later explained that he had decided against seeking to become a regular officer and to continue after the age of thirty, as the part of the work he had really enjoyed was commanding soldiers, and this was likely to diminish after that point.

Wallace is a member of the Royal Company of Archers, a ceremonial unit that serves as the Sovereign's bodyguard in Scotland. As such, he took a turn standing vigil over Queen Elizabeth's coffin as she lay in state in Westminster Hall on 15 September 2022.

Political career

Scottish Parliament
Wallace entered politics after leaving the army, citing as a reason for this decision the experience he had commanding men from some of the UK's most economically deprived areas, which he averred could be improved by promoting a more aspirational society. Wallace became a Conservative Member of the Scottish Parliament in 1999, as a list MSP for North East Scotland. He stood down in 2003, as he sought selection for a Westminster constituency in England. Wallace was the Scottish Conservatives' shadow health spokesman during that time.

From 2003 to 2005 he was overseas director of the aerospace company QinetiQ, the UK's former Defence Evaluation and Research Agency (DERA).

Member of UK Parliament
Wallace was elected as Member of Parliament for the Lancaster and Wyre constituency at the 2005 general election. He gained the seat from Labour with 22,266 votes and a majority of 4,171 (8.0%). The constituency was abolished for the 2010 general election, and Wallace was elected for the new seat of Wyre and Preston North with 26,877 votes and a majority of 15,844 (30.9%). He was re-elected at the 2015, 2017, and 2019 general elections, with majorities suggesting he now held a safe seat for his party.

From 2005 to 2010, Wallace was a member of the Scottish Affairs Select Committee of the House of Commons. From 2006 to 2010 he was also the Shadow Minister of State for Scotland and was Chairman of the British–Iran Parliamentary Group from 2006 to 2014. On 13 November 2008, Wallace received the  Campaigner of the Year title in the Spectator/Threadneedle Parliamentarian Awards, for his work promoting transparency of MPs' expenses.

Wallace faced local criticism after it was revealed that in 2008 he made the fourth-highest expenses claim of any MP, claiming £175,523 on top of his £63,000 salary. However, he defended this by arguing that his constituency had an electorate that was nearly 20% larger than the average one in England.

Junior ministerial roles and EU referendum
Following his re-election to Parliament in 2010, Wallace was appointed as parliamentary private secretary (PPS) to the then-Justice Secretary and Lord Chancellor, and later minister without portfolio in the Cabinet Office, Kenneth Clarke. On 4 September 2012, Wallace turned down a position as a Lord Commissioner of the Treasury during the cabinet reshuffle to remain Clarke's PPS. He voted against the Marriage (Same Sex Couples) Act 2013, which legalised same-sex marriage in England and Wales.

In July 2014, as Clarke returned to the back benches, Wallace was again offered a job in Government as a whip. This time he accepted. 
Also in 2014, he became an early supporter of a future leadership bid by Boris Johnson, who was not then in parliament.

In May 2015 Wallace was promoted to Parliamentary Under-Secretary of State in the Northern Ireland Office.

Early in 2016, with the approach of the European Union referendum, Boris Johnson was wavering between Leave and Remain, and Wallace advised him strongly to support Remain, as taking the Leave side would mean being allied with "clowns". Wallace himself supported the Remain side before the referendum. After it had been won by Leave, David Cameron resigned as party leader. Johnson at once launched a leadership campaign run by Wallace and Lynton Crosby. However, a week later, after Michael Gove had decided to stand as well, Johnson withdrew.

The new Prime Minister, Theresa May, promoted Wallace to Minister of State for Security in the Home Office. He voted for her Brexit withdrawal agreement in early 2019, and against any referendum on a Brexit withdrawal agreement.

In December 2017, Wallace’s ministerial portfolio was extended to include economic crime. He was Security Minister during the terror attacks of 2017 and the attempted assassination of Sergei Skripal in Salisbury. Wallace was appointed to the Privy Council for his role in coordinating the government response to the 2017 Westminster attack.

Secretary of State for Defence

On 24 July 2019, Boris Johnson became Prime Minister and immediately appointed Wallace as Secretary of State for Defence, to replace Penny Mordaunt, who was left out of the new government.

In August 2019, Wallace was overheard discussing Johnson's controversial prorogation of parliament with Florence Parly, the French Armed Forces minister. He suggested that the reason for the prorogation for five weeks was to prevent MPs from blocking the government's Brexit plans, rather than the government's official position that it was to introduce a new legislative agenda. 10 Downing Street responded to his comments by admonishing him and stating that he had "misspoken". This prorogation was deemed unlawful by the Supreme Court on 24 September 2019.

On 13 October 2019, in a NATO meeting, Wallace defended the 2019 Turkish offensive into north-eastern Syria. He commented, "Turkey needs to do what it sometimes has to do to defend itself". His comments were condemned by other delegates at the meeting.

On 12 January 2020, in an interview with The Sunday Times, Wallace said that the UK "must be prepared to fight wars without the US", one of the UK's key allies. He stated that the upcoming defence review "should be used to make the UK less dependent on the US in future conflicts". His comments were made in response to US President Donald Trump's "America First" isolationist policies. Wallace also said that the next defence review would be the "deepest review" of Britain's defence and foreign policies since the end of the Cold War in 1991.

On 15 March 2021 Wallace released the command paper 411, the Integrated Review Defence in a competitive age, in which he detailed "a mission to seek out and to understand future threats, and to invest in the capabilities to defeat them" with an expenditure of "£188bn on Defence over the coming four years".

In July 2021 Wallace said the US put Britain in a "very difficult position" following the withdrawal of most US troops from Afghanistan. Soon after the withdrawal of US troops had started, the Taliban had launched an offensive against the Afghan government, quickly advancing in front of a collapsing Afghan Armed Forces. Wallace said the UK would be ready to work with the Taliban should they come to power provided they adhere to certain international norms.

On 16 August 2021, during an interview on LBC about the US Afghanistan withdrawal, Wallace was asked by an LBC interviewer, "Why do you feel it so personally, Mr Wallace?" He replied with emotion, "Because I'm a soldier ... because it's sad, and the West has done what it's done and we have to do our very best to get people out and stand by our obligations". On 26 August, Wallace was accused of abandoning Pen Farthing, who ran an animal sanctuary in Kabul and was seeking permission for a private jet to be given clearance by the Ministry of Defence to get 71 people and more than 100 animals to the UK. The next day, he gave clearance for the $500,000 private plane to land at Kabul Airport. Wallace said Ministry of Defence staff had suffered abuse from some of Farthing's supporters.

In a phone call with Saudi Arabia's vice defence minister Prince Khalid bin Salman, Wallace discussed ways to strengthen defence relations with Saudi Arabia, particularly military exports. In December 2021, he met with Saudi Arabia's Crown Prince Mohammed bin Salman to discuss cooperation in various fields, especially defence.

Upon the 40th anniversary of the end of the Falklands War in 2022, Wallace declared Britain's determination to "stand up to bullies", sparking a crescendo in "dialectic tension" vis-à-vis the relations between the United Kingdom and Argentina. The Argentine government decried these declarations as "belligerent threats" and "denigrating references".

He met Russian Defence Minister Sergey Shoygu on 11 February 2022. The following day, Wallace said that a Russian invasion of Ukraine was "highly likely", and British citizens were being told by the Foreign Office to evacuate while commercial means were still available. Ukraine's ambassador to the UK, Vadym Prystaiko, said Wallace's comparison of diplomatic efforts with Russia to the appeasement policies of the 1930s was unhelpful, saying now is the wrong time to "offend our partners". In February 2022, Wallace was filmed saying that the Scots Guards "kicked the backside" of Nicholas I of Russia in the Crimean War, and could do so again.

On 21 March 2022, clipped footage of Wallace in a prank call by Russian pranksters Vovan and Lexus was released online. The duo, who are suspected by critics of links to Russian security services or of being Russian state actors, impersonated the Ukrainian prime minister Denys Shmyhal saying that Ukraine wished to promote its own nuclear deterrent to protect itself from Russia, a false claim made by the Russian government during the Russo-Ukrainian War and the invasion of Ukraine. Wallace was believed to be on a Microsoft Teams call with the duo for ten minutes. That day, Wallace announced plans to reduce the number of British Army personnel from 76,500 down to 72,500.

In spring while the 2022 Russian invasion of Ukraine was raging fiercely and the NATO allies had thrown in for Ukraine, a controversial decision was made by Boris Johnson (who was an ardent supporter of Ukraine) not to send the Challenger 2 tank to Ukraine. Wallace had said on 27 March that the idea "wouldn't work". Johnson and his German counterpart Olaf Scholz on 8 April that both Western European allies would withhold their MBTs from the fray. Johnson instead chose to backfill the Polish Army thus allowing them to send their obsolete T-72s to Ukraine, while they waited for their order of South Korean K2 Black Panther replacements. It was discovered in May 2022 that the overall number of tanks would be cut from 227 Challenger 2 tanks to 148 upgraded Challenger 3 tanks and that the remaining 79 tanks would not be sent to the Ukrainians; this resulted in some consternation. However, Wallace later announced that the number of Challenger MBTs the UK would require would be reviewed to see if a larger fleet would be needed.

Following the July 2022 United Kingdom government crisis, Wallace was seen as a contender to become the next leader of the Conservative Party and thus Prime Minister, but he ruled himself out from entering the contest on 10 July. In a statement on Twitter, he said his focus was on his current job and "keeping this great country safe". He later endorsed Liz Truss in the election. Following the appointment of Truss as Prime Minister, Wallace was reappointed to his post on 6 September. He retained his post when Rishi Sunak became prime minister on 25 October.

On 7 November, Wallace announced that the competition to build a new national flagship yacht would be scrapped with immediate effect.

Personal life
Wallace married Liza Cooke in 2001; the couple have two sons and a daughter. His wife worked as a part-time parliamentary assistant in his office until 30 April 2019. They met when she was a researcher in the Scottish Parliament and Wallace was an MSP. He is separated from his wife.

Wallace lives in Lancashire and London. Outside politics, he lists his recreations as skiing, sailing, rugby and horse racing. He is a member of the Third Guards club.

Honours

References

External links

 
 Ben Wallace MP  Conservative Party profile
 

News articles
 Yobs in June 2005
 Iris scanning in January 2007
 Explaining his expenses in February 2008

|-

|-

1970 births
Living people
20th-century British Army personnel
British military personnel of The Troubles (Northern Ireland)
Conservative MSPs
Conservative Party (UK) MPs for English constituencies
English people of Scottish descent
Graduates of the Royal Military Academy Sandhurst
Members of the Privy Council of the United Kingdom
Members of the Royal Company of Archers
Members of the Scottish Parliament 1999–2003
People educated at Millfield
People from Farnborough, London
Recipients of the Order of Prince Yaroslav the Wise, 2nd class
Secretaries of State for Defence (UK)
Scots Guards officers
UK MPs 2005–2010
UK MPs 2010–2015
UK MPs 2015–2017
UK MPs 2017–2019
UK MPs 2019–present